Colborne may refer to:

Places
Colborne, Norfolk County, Ontario
Colborne, Northumberland County, Ontario
Colborne Parish, New Brunswick

Other uses
Colborne (surname), a surname